Daniel Maiava is an Australian rugby union player who plays for the  in Super Rugby. His playing position is lock. He was named in the Rebels squad for the Round 6 match of the 2022 Super Rugby Pacific season, making his debut in the same match. He was previously a member of the Rebels academy promoted to this first team squad.

Super Rugby statistics

Reference list

Australian rugby union players
Living people
Rugby union locks
Melbourne Rebels players
Year of birth missing (living people)
Rugby union flankers